(He that shall endure to the end), is a motet for a four-part choir by Felix Mendelssohn. He wrote it as part of his oratorio Elijah, published in 1847.

History 
Mendelssohn composed the motet with orchestral accompaniment as part of his oratorio Elijah, as movement 32, published in 1847. It was published in a critical edition by Carus-Verlag.

Text and music 
In the oratorio, the motet is placed like a chorale as a point of rest and reflection. Elijah is in the desert and has given up, reviewing his mission as a failure, but an angel requests him to arise. The text of the motet occurs twice in the Gospel of Matthew, in Matthew 10:22 and Matthew 24:13. Mendelssohn used the translation by Martin Luther. The English translation is from the King James Version of the Bible.

The music is in one movement in F major and common time, marked Andante sostenuto. The instruments play colla parte with the voices. It has been described as "delicate".

References

External links 
 
 
 Wer bis an das Ende beharrt [He that shall endure to the end] from Elias [Elijah] (Matthew 24:13) – by Felix Mendelssohn Bartholdy bibleasmusic.com
 "Sei stille dem Herrn und warte auf ihn" – Digitaler Fastenimpuls (in German) evangelischekirchehochdahl.de

Motets
Compositions by Felix Mendelssohn
1847 compositions
Compositions in F major